Aniruddha Roy Chowdhury is an Indian film director. He is the director and producer of multiple Bengali and Hindi films. He directed the highly successful Hindi movie Pink which received accolades from film critics and movie lovers alike.

Career
Aniruddha has started his film career from 2006 Bengali film Anuranan. He has won three national awards, Aravindan Puraskaram, one International Indian Film Academy Awards, two Zee Cine Awards, two ETC Bollywood Business Awards, one Stardust Awards, best director at Jagran Film Festival to name a few. Alongside feature films, he has directed and produced over four hundred ad films.

Aniruddha received National Film Awards for both Pink and Anuranan. He received a National Film Award in the Best Film category for his 2008 movie Antaheen. The actor also made a cameo appearance in the 2015 Hindi film Piku. He went on to win multiple awards, he has made movies on important societal themes, enthralling fans and encouraging them to think about issues.

Filmography

Films

Web series

References

External links
 

Living people
Film directors from Kolkata
Bengali film directors
Heramba Chandra College alumni
University of Calcutta alumni
Directors who won the Best Feature Film National Film Award
Directors who won the Best Film on Other Social Issues National Film Award
International Indian Film Academy Awards winners
1964 births